Maryland Million Turf Sprint Handicap is an American Thoroughbred horse race held annually in October since 2004 primarily at Laurel Park Racecourse in Laurel, Maryland or at Pimlico Race Course in Baltimore. To be eligible for the Maryland Million Turf Sprint Handicap, a horse must be sired by a stallion who stands in Maryland. Due to that restriction the race is classified as a non-graded or "listed" stakes race and is not eligible for grading by the American Graded Stakes Committee.

The race is part of Maryland Million Day, a twelve-race program held in mid October that was the creation of renowned television sports journalist Jim McKay. The "Maryland Million" is the first State-Bred showcase event ever created. Since 1986, 27 other events in twenty states have imitated the showcase and its structure.

In its sixth running in 2009, the race was restricted to those horses who were sired by a stallion who stands in the State of Maryland. Both the entrant horse and their stallion must be nominated to the Maryland Million program.

Records 

Most wins: 
 3 - Ben's Cat (2010, 2011, 2012)

Speed record: 
 0:55.80 - Deliver the Roses (2006)

Most wins by an owner:
 3 - The Jim Stable (2010, 2011, 2012)

Most wins by a jockey:
 2 - Ramon Dominguez - (2005 & 2009)
 2 - Julien Pimental (2010 & 2012)

Most wins by a trainer:
 3 - King T. Leatherbury - (2010, 2011, 2012)
 2 - Ben M. Feliciano Jr. - (2004 & 2009)

Winners of the Maryland Million Turf Sprint Handicap since 2004

See also 

 Maryland Million Turf Sprint Handicap top three finishers
 Maryland Million Day
 Laurel Park Racecourse

References

 Maryland Thoroughbred official website

Horse races in Maryland
Recurring events established in 2004
Laurel Park Racecourse
Recurring sporting events established in 2004